Herbert Perrott may refer to:

 Herbert Perrott (MP) (c. 1617–1683), Member of Parliament for Haverfordwest and Weobley
 Sir Herbert Perrott, 5th Baronet (1849–1922), Companion of Honour